Daniel Kenneth Rothbart (Stanford, CA, January 29, 1966), is an artist and writer.

Early life 
Rothbart was born in Stanford, California and raised in Eugene, Oregon. He studied sculpture at the Rhode Island School of Design and Columbia University.

Art and writing 
Daniel Rothbart is an artist and writer whose work explores the relationship between nature, urban postmodern identity and metaphysics. In the words of critic John Ash, "What he presents is the visual aspect of an imaginary 'ritual without theology' (to use his own phrase)." Art theorist and curator Enrico Pedrini wrote, "His world of myth prompts one to reconsider the sacred as a point of interaction where icons and symbols converge and undergo changes of meaning."

Rothbart has exhibited at Andrea Meislin Gallery, Exit Art, WhiteBox, and the LAB Gallery in New York City along with the Hudson Valley Center for Contemporary Art in Peekskill, New York and the Artists Residence Gallery in Herzliya, Israel. Studio projects include Inscrutable Theologies, Aachen, Germany; STREAMING II, The Frank Institute @ CR10, Linlithgo, New York; The Rumsey Street Project, Grand Rapids, Michigan; Air de Venise, Venice, Italy; WATERLINES, Galerie Depardieu, Nice, France; and La Napoule Art Foundation, Mandelieu-la-Napoule, France. He exhibited in Ventisette artisti e una rivista, Galleria Nazionale d’Arte Moderna, Rome, Italy; Citydrift, Momenta Art, Brooklyn, New York; But I’m an American, Belgrade Cultural Centre, Serbia; and Meditation | Mediation, Life is Art Foundation, New Orleans, Louisiana.

Rothbart was awarded a New York Foundation for the Arts grant and a residency at La Napoule Art Foundation in 2002. His work is the subject of a monograph by Enrico Pedrini published in 2010 by Ulisse e Calipso of Naples, Italy. Rothbart’s work can be found in public and private collections, including the Museum of Modern Art in New York.

In 2015, Rothbart wrote an essay and four commentaries on the theme of water-based performance as the lead section of PAJ 111, published by MIT Press. Rothbart is the author of three books. Jewish Metaphysics as Generative Principle in American Art (1994) explores the relationship between Jewish culture and post-war American abstraction. The Story of the Phoenix (1999) examines American cultural identity, Hollywood, and the transmutation of meaning through digital collages inhabited by his sculpture. Seeing Naples: Reports from the Shadow of Vesuvius (2018) is a book of travel writing inspired by Rothbart's experiences as a Fulbright scholar in Naples during the early 1990s. The work combines personal narrative with stories from the city's history, ancient and modern, that speak to Neapolitan values and culture. Poet and cultural critic Wayne Koestenbaum observes "Rothbart's narrative of Naples bears the freight of a melancholy intrinsic to the act of paying attention to a city that is older and wiser than we will ever live to be."

Books 
Jewish Metaphysics as Generative Principle in American Art (Ulisse e Calipso, 1994).

The Story of the Phoenix (Ulisse e Calipso, 1999).

Seeing Naples: Reports from the Shadow of Vesuvius (Edgewise Press, 2018).

Bibliography 
Enrico Pedrini, John Perreault and Varda Genossar, Daniel Rothbart: Works 1988 – 2009 (Ulisse e Calipso, 2010).

Lux, Simonetta, Arte ipercontemporanea. Un certo loro sguardo... Ulteriori protocolli dell'arte contemporanea (Gangemi Editore, 2006).

References

External links 
Daniel Rothbart Official site
Daniel Rothbart on YouTube
“Seeing Naples at Hudson Hall.” The Roundtable. WAMC Northeast Public Radio, April 3, 2019.
De Leonardis, Manuela, Napoli, una teatrale quotidianità tra sguardi e souvenir, Il Manifesto, October 2018.
Notte, Riccardo, Seeing Naples: Reports from the Shadow of Vesuvius, Sdefinizioni Art Mag, January 2019.
Perreault, John, Daniel Rothbart, The Space @ Media Triangle, Sculpture Magazine, May 2003.
Moral, Sukran, Rothbart dalla parte di Moral, Luxflux, July 2003.

1966 births
Living people
Writers from California